Bernd Knuppel (born 7 August 1962) is a sailor from Uruguay, who represented his country at the 1984 Summer Olympics in Los Angeles, United States as helmsman in the Soling. With crew members Alejandro Ferreiro and Enrique Dupont they took the 7th place.

References

Living people
1962 births
Sailors at the 1984 Summer Olympics – Soling
Sailors at the 1988 Summer Olympics – Star
Olympic sailors of Uruguay
Uruguayan male sailors (sport)